The Canton of La Conca-d'Oro is a former canton of the arrondissement of Bastia, in the Haute-Corse department, France. It had 4,997 inhabitants (2012). It was created 18 August 1973 by the decree 73-825. It was disbanded following the French canton reorganisation which came into effect in March 2015. 

The canton comprised the following communes:

Barbaggio 
Farinole 
Oletta 
Olmeta-di-Tuda 
Patrimonio 
Poggio-d'Oletta 
Saint-Florent 
Vallecalle

References

Conca-d'Oro
2015 disestablishments in France
States and territories disestablished in 2015